Fasilides (Ge'ez: ፋሲልደስ; Fāsīladas; 20 November 1603 – 18 October 1667), also known as Fasil, Basilide, or Basilides (as in the works of Edward Gibbon), was Emperor of Ethiopia from 1632 to his death on 18 October 1667, and a member of the Solomonic dynasty. His throne name was Alam Sagad (Ge'ez: ዓለም ሰገድ). 

Of Amhara descent, he was the son of Emperor Susenyos I and Empress Seltan Mogasa (Ge'ez: ሥልጣን ሞገሳ) (throne name) or Wald Sa'ala (Ge'ez: ወልድ ሠዓለ) (name) of Wagda Katata and Merhabete. Emperor Fasilides was born at Magazaz in Bulga, Shewa. His paternal grandfather's name was also Fasilides. He was builder of the Fasil palace.

History

Fasilides was proclaimed emperor in 1630 during a revolt led by Sarsa Krestos, but did not reach the throne until his father abdicated in 1632. Once he became emperor, Fasilides immediately restored the official status of the traditional Ethiopian Orthodox Church. He sent for a new abuna from the patriarch of Alexandria, restoring the ancient relationship that had been allowed to lapse.  He confiscated the lands of the Jesuits at Dankaz and elsewhere in the empire and exiled them to Fremona. When he heard that the Portuguese bombarded Mombasa, Fasilides assumed that Afonso Mendes, the Roman Catholic prelate, was behind the act, and banished the remaining Jesuits from his lands. Mendes and most of his followers made their way back to Goa, being robbed or imprisoned several times on the way. In 1665, he ordered the "Books of the Franks"—the remaining religious writings of the Catholics—burnt.

Fasilides is commonly credited with founding the city of Gondar in 1636, establishing it as Ethiopia's capital. Whether or not a community existed here before he made it his capital is unknown.  Amongst the buildings he had constructed there are the beginnings of the complex later known as Fasil Ghebbi, as well as some of the earliest of Gondar's fabled 44 churches: Adababay Iyasus, Adababay Tekle Haymanot, Atatami Mikael, Gemjabet Mariyam, Fit Mikael, and Qeddus Abbo. He is also credited with building seven stone bridges in Ethiopia, notably the Sebara Dildiy bridge; as a result all old bridges in Ethiopia are often commonly believed to be his work. 
  Emperor Fasilides also built the Cathedral Church of St Mary of Zion at Axum.  Fasilides' church is known today as the "Old Cathedral" and stands next to a newer cathedral built by Emperor Haile Selassie.

The rebellion of the Agaw in Lasta, which had begun under his father, continued into his reign and for the rest of his reign he made regular punitive expeditions into Lasta. The first, in 1637, went badly, for at the Battle of Libo his men panicked before the Agaw assault and their leader, Melka Kristos, entered Fasilides' palace and took the throne for himself. Fasilides quickly recovered and sent for help to Qegnazmach Dimmo, governor of Semien, and his brother Gelawdewos, governor of Begemder. These marched on Melka Kristos, who was still at Libo, where he was killed and his men defeated. The next year Fasilides marched into Lasta; according to James Bruce, the Agaw retreated to their mountain strongholds, and "almost the whole army perished amidst the mountains; great part from famine, but a greater still from cold, a very remarkable circumstance in these latitudes."

Soon after he took the throne from his father, Fasilides ended all forms of contact between Ethiopia and Europe, expelling all European Jesuits and their missionaries while forming security pacts with the surrounding Islamic sultanates and initiating diplomatic relations with Islamic kingdoms such as the Persians, Ottomans, the Mogul of India and the Imams of Yemen. This isolation of the Ethiopian empire from Europe lasted more than two centuries.

Fasilides tried through 1642–1647 to establish diplomatic relations with Al-Mutawakkil Isma'il, the Zaydi Imam of Yemen. An embassy was sent back by the Yemenis in 1647 through way of Beilul. The effort, aimed at opening a new trade route bypassing Ottoman-held Massawa, was ultimately unsuccessful.

He also dispatched an embassy to India in 1664–5 to congratulate Aurangzeb upon his accession to the throne of the Mughal Empire. Its arrival, much impoverished, is described by the French traveler François Bernier who was then at Aurangzeb's court.

In 1666, after his son Dawit rebelled, Fasilides had him incarcerated at Wehni, reviving the ancient practice of confining troublesome members of the Imperial family to a mountaintop, as they had once been confined at Amba Geshen.

Death
When Nathaniel T. Kenney was shown Fasilides' remains, he saw a smaller mummy also shared the coffin. A monk told Kenney that it was Fasilides' seven-year-old son Isur, who had been smothered in a crush of people who had come to pay the new king homage.

Descendants
Fasilides had three sons (of which two died before coming of age) and three daughters.

● Yohannes I was the eldest son and successor.

● His two other sons (Dawit and Isuor) died before Fasilides.

● Theoclea was his eldest daughter, she married one of her father's retainer Laeka Krestos a son of noblemen Malkae Krestos.

● Kedeste Krestos was his second daughter, she married and had issue.

● Sabla Wangel was his third daughter. It's through her line that Emperor Tewodros I claimed Solomonic descent from Fasiliades, almost two centuries later.

References

External links

Further reading 
  Emeri Johannes van Donzel, A Yemenite Embassy to Ethiopia 1647-1649 (Äthiopistische Forschungen Band 21) (Stuttgart: Franz Steiner, 1986)

1603 births
1667 deaths
17th-century emperors of Ethiopia
People from Azezo
Solomonic dynasty